The Johns Hopkins School of Public Health Department of Biochemistry and Molecular Biology (BMB) was established in 1916, as the Department of Chemical Hygiene.  That same year, the Johns Hopkins School of Hygiene and Public Health was founded, as it was named then. Today, the school is named the Bloomberg School of Public Health and is part of the Johns Hopkins University in Baltimore, Maryland, United States.

The Department has changed names three times in its history from the Department of Chemical Hygiene, when it was founded, to the Department of Biochemistry by the time Roger H. Herriott was its Chair in 1948, to the Department of Biochemistry and Molecular Biology by the time Roger McMacken was its chair in 1990. Yet, since that time it has remained as the Department of Biochemistry and Molecular Biology.

As of 2019, BMB is chaired by Ashani Weeraratna.

History
Elmer V. McCollum, the Department’s first Professor and Chair, discovered vitamins A, B and D, as well as the importance of trace metals in diets. McCollum was the chair of the department for 27 years, from 1917 until 1944. After stepping down as the Chair of the Department, McCollum went on to help establish the McCollum-Pratt Institute at the Johns Hopkins University Homewood Campus.

Division of Reproductive Biology

The Division of Reproductive Biology was established in the School of Public Health in 1972. With its emphasis on biochemistry, molecular biology, cell biology, physiology and genetics of reproductive processes. Prior to the Division becoming part of BMB in 1998, it was part of the Department of Population Dynamics, also at the School of Public Health. The research of the Division's faculty is both basic and applied, often extending from the molecule to the individual patient to the population. The current head of the Division is William W. Wright.

Degree programs
BMB offers three degrees: Master of Health Science (MHS), Master of Science (ScM), and a Doctoral (PhD) degree. The MHS program is a one-year program in which students only take classes and the ScM program takes about two years to complete and consists of students taking classes their first year and laboratory work their second year. Both require writing a thesis to obtain a degree.

Department Chairs
Elmer V. McCollum (1917–1944)
Roger M. Herriott (1948–1975)
Lawrence Grossman (1975–1990)
Roger McMacken (1990–2008)
Barry Zirkin (2008) Interim
Pierre A. Coulombe (2008–2017)
Michael Matunis (2017–2019) Interim
Ashani Weeraratna (2019–present)

References

External links
JHU BMB official website

Johns Hopkins University